Kimiko Date-Krumm was the defending champion, but subsequently fell to 8th seed Ágnes Szávay in the quarterfinals.
5th seed Alisa Kleybanova emerged as the new champion, beating out Czech Klára Zakopalová in the final, 6-1, 6-3.

Seeds

Draw

Finals

Top half

Bottom half

External links
Main Draw and Qualifying Draw

Korea Open (tennis)
Korea Open - Singles